A lubricant (sometimes shortened to lube) is a substance that helps to reduce friction between surfaces in mutual contact, which ultimately reduces the heat generated when the surfaces move. It may also have the function of transmitting forces, transporting foreign particles, or heating or cooling the surfaces. The property of reducing friction is known as lubricity.

In addition to industrial applications, lubricants are used for many other purposes. Other uses include cooking (oils and fats in use in frying pans, in baking to prevent food sticking), bioapplications on humans (e.g. lubricants for artificial joints), ultrasound examination, medical examination, and sexual intercourse. It is mainly used to reduce friction and to contribute to a better and efficient functioning of a mechanism.

History
Lubricants have been in some use for thousands of years. Calcium soaps have been identified on the axles of chariots dated to 1400 BC. Building stones were slid on oil-impregnated lumber in the time of the pyramids. In the Roman era, lubricants were based on olive oil and rapeseed oil, as well as animal fats. The growth of lubrication accelerated in the Industrial Revolution with the accompanying use of metal-based machinery. Relying initially on natural oils, needs for such machinery shifted toward petroleum-based materials early in the 1900s. A breakthrough came with the development of vacuum distillation of petroleum, as described by the Vacuum Oil Company. This technology allowed the purification of very nonvolatile substances, which are common in many lubricants.

Properties 

A good lubricant generally possesses the following characteristics:
 A high boiling point and low freezing point (in order to stay liquid within a wide range of temperature)
 A high viscosity index
 Thermal stability
 Hydraulic stability
 Demulsibility
 Corrosion prevention
 A high resistance to oxidation

Formulation 

Typically lubricants contain 90% base oil (most often petroleum fractions, called mineral oils) and less than 10% additives. Vegetable oils or synthetic liquids such as hydrogenated polyolefins, esters, silicones, fluorocarbons and many others are sometimes used as base oils. Additives deliver reduced friction and wear, increased viscosity, improved viscosity index, resistance to corrosion and oxidation, aging or contamination, etc.

Non-liquid lubricants include powders (dry graphite, PTFE, molybdenum disulphide, tungsten disulphide, etc.), PTFE tape used in plumbing, air cushion and others. Dry lubricants such as graphite, molybdenum disulphide and tungsten disulphide also offer lubrication at temperatures (up to 350 °C) higher than liquid and oil-based lubricants are able to operate. Limited interest has been shown in low friction properties of compacted oxide glaze layers formed at several hundred degrees Celsius in metallic sliding systems, however, practical use is still many years away due to their physically unstable nature.

Additives 

A large number of additives are used to impart performance characteristics to the lubricants. Modern automotive lubricants contain as many as ten additives, comprising up to 20% of the lubricant, the main families of additives are:
 Pour point depressants are compounds that prevent crystallization of waxes. Long chain alkylbenzenes adhere to small crystallites of wax, preventing crystal growth.
 Anti-foaming agents are typically silicone compounds which increase surface tension in order to discourage foam formation.
 Viscosity index improvers (VIIs) are compounds that allow lubricants to remain viscous at higher temperatures. Typical VIIs are polyacrylates and butadiene.
 Antioxidants suppress the rate of oxidative degradation of the hydrocarbon molecules within the lubricant. At low temperatures, free radical inhibitors such as hindered phenols are used, e.g. butylated hydroxytoluene. At temperatures >90 °C, where the metals catalyze the oxidation process, dithiophosphates are more useful. In the latter application the additives are called metal deactivators.
 Detergents ensure the cleanliness of engine components by preventing the formation of deposits on contact surfaces at high temperatures.
 Corrosion inhibitors (rust inhibitors) are usually alkaline materials, such as alkylsulfonate salts, that absorb acids that would corrode metal parts.
 Anti-wear additives form protective 'tribofilms' on metal parts, suppressing wear. They come in two classes depending on the strength with which they bind to the surface. Popular examples include phosphate esters and zinc dithiophosphates. 
 Extreme pressure (anti-scuffing) additives form protective films on sliding metal parts. These agents are often sulfur compounds, such as dithiophosphates.
 Friction modifiers reduce friction and wear, particularly in the boundary lubrication regime where surfaces come into direct contact.

Types of lubricants 

In 1999, an estimated 37,300,000 tons of lubricants were consumed worldwide. Automotive applications dominate, including electric vehicles but other industrial, marine, and metal working applications are also big consumers of lubricants. Although air and other gas-based lubricants are known (e.g., in fluid bearings), liquid lubricants dominate the market, followed by solid lubricants.

Lubricants are generally composed of a majority of base oil plus a variety of additives to impart desirable characteristics. Although generally lubricants are based on one type of base oil, mixtures of the base oils also are used to meet performance requirements.

Mineral oil 

The term "mineral oil" is used to refer to lubricating base oils derived from crude oil. The American Petroleum Institute (API) designates several types of lubricant base oil:

 Group I – Saturates < 90% and/or sulfur > 0.03%, and Society of Automotive Engineers (SAE) viscosity index (VI) of 80 to 120
 Manufactured by solvent extraction, solvent or catalytic dewaxing, and hydro-finishing processes. Common Group I base oil are 150SN (solvent neutral), 500SN, and 150BS (brightstock)
 Group II – Saturates > 90% and sulfur < 0.03%, and SAE viscosity index of 80 to 120
 Manufactured by hydrocracking and solvent or catalytic dewaxing processes. Group II base oil has superior anti-oxidation properties since virtually all hydrocarbon molecules are saturated. It has water-white color.
 Group III – Saturates > 90%, sulfur < 0.03%, and SAE viscosity index over 120
 Manufactured by special processes such as isohydromerization. Can be manufactured from base oil or slax wax from dewaxing process.
 Group IV – Polyalphaolefins (PAO)
 Group V – All others not included above, such as naphthenics, polyalkylene glycols (PAG), and polyesters.

The lubricant industry commonly extends this group terminology to include:
 Group I+ with a viscosity index of 103–108
 Group II+ with a viscosity index of 113–119
 Group III+ with a viscosity index of at least 140

Can also be classified into three categories depending on the prevailing compositions:
 Paraffinic
 Naphthenic
 Aromatic

Synthetic oils 
Petroleum-derived lubricant can also be produced using synthetic hydrocarbons (derived ultimately from petroleum), "synthetic oils".

These include:
 Polyalpha-olefin (PAO)
 Synthetic esters
 Polyalkylene glycols (PAG)
 Phosphate esters
 Perfluoropolyether (PFPE)
 Alkylated naphthalenes (AN)
 Silicate esters
 Ionic fluids
 Multiply alkylated cyclopentanes (MAC)

Solid lubricants 

PTFE: polytetrafluoroethylene (PTFE) is typically used as a coating layer on, for example, cooking utensils to provide a non-stick surface. Its usable temperature range up to 350 °C and chemical inertness make it a useful additive in special greases, where it can function both as a thickener and a lubricant. Under extreme pressures, PTFE powder or solids is of little value as it is soft and flows away from the area of contact. Ceramic or metal or alloy lubricants must be used then.

Inorganic solids: Graphite, hexagonal boron nitride, molybdenum disulfide and tungsten disulfide are examples of solid lubricants. Some retain their lubricity to very high temperatures. The use of some such materials is sometimes restricted by their poor resistance to oxidation (e.g., molybdenum disulfide degrades above 350 °C in air, but 1100 °C in reducing environments.

Metal/alloy: Metal alloys, composites and pure metals can be used as grease additives or the sole constituents of sliding surfaces and bearings. Cadmium and gold are used for plating surfaces which gives them good corrosion resistance and sliding properties, Lead, tin, zinc alloys and various bronze alloys are used as sliding bearings, or their powder can be used to lubricate sliding surfaces alone.

Aqueous lubrication 
Aqueous lubrication is of interest in a number of technological applications. Strongly hydrated brush polymers such as PEG can serve as lubricants at liquid solid interfaces. By continuous rapid exchange of bound water with other free water molecules, these polymer films keep the surfaces separated while maintaining a high fluidity at the brush–brush interface at high compressions, thus leading to a very low coefficient of friction.

Biolubricant 
Biolubricants are derived from vegetable oils and other renewable sources. They usually are triglyceride esters (fats obtained from plants and animals). For lubricant base oil use, the vegetable derived materials are preferred. Common ones include high oleic canola oil, castor oil, palm oil, sunflower seed oil and rapeseed oil from vegetable, and tall oil from tree sources. Many vegetable oils are often hydrolyzed to yield the acids which are subsequently combined selectively to form specialist synthetic esters. Other naturally derived lubricants include lanolin (wool grease, a natural water repellent).

Whale oil was a historically important lubricant, with some uses up to the latter part of the 20th century as a friction modifier additive for automatic transmission fluid.

In 2008, the biolubricant market was around 1% of UK lubricant sales in a total lubricant market of 840,000 tonnes/year.

, researchers at Australia's CSIRO have been studying safflower oil as an engine lubricant, finding superior performance and lower emissions than petroleum-based lubricants in applications such as engine-driven lawn mowers, chainsaws and other agricultural equipment. Grain-growers trialling the product have welcomed the innovation, with one describing it as needing very little refining, biodegradable, a bioenergy and biofuel. The scientists have reengineered the plant using gene silencing, creating a variety that produces up to 93% of oil, the highest currently available from any plant. Researchers at Montana State University’s Advanced Fuel Centre in the US studying the oil’s performance in a large diesel engine, comparing it with conventional oil, have described the results as a "game-changer".

Functions of lubricants 
One of the largest applications for lubricants, in the form of motor oil, is protecting the internal combustion engines in motor vehicles and powered equipment.

Lubricant vs. anti-tack coating 
Anti-tack or anti-stick coatings are designed to reduce the adhesive condition (stickiness) of a given material. The rubber, hose, and wire and cable industries are the largest consumers of anti-tack products but virtually every industry uses some form of anti-sticking agent. Anti-sticking agents differ from lubricants in that they are designed to reduce the inherently adhesive qualities of a given compound while lubricants are designed to reduce friction between any two surfaces.

Keep moving parts apart 
Lubricants are typically used to separate moving parts in a system. This separation has the benefit of reducing friction, wear and surface fatigue, together with reduced heat generation, operating noise and vibrations. Lubricants achieve this in several ways. The most common is by forming a physical barrier i.e., a thin layer of lubricant separates the moving parts. This is analogous to hydroplaning, the loss of friction observed when a car tire is separated from the road surface by moving through standing water. This is termed hydrodynamic lubrication. In cases of high surface pressures or temperatures, the fluid film is much thinner and some of the forces are transmitted between the surfaces through the lubricant.

Reduce friction 
Typically the lubricant-to-surface friction is much less than surface-to-surface friction in a system without any lubrication. Thus use of a lubricant reduces the overall system friction. Reduced friction has the benefit of reducing heat generation and reduced formation of wear particles as well as improved efficiency. Lubricants may contain polar additives known as friction modifiers that chemically bind to metal surfaces to reduce surface friction even when there is insufficient bulk lubricant present for hydrodynamic lubrication, e.g. protecting the valve train in a car engine at startup. The base oil itself might also be polar in nature and as a result inherently able to bind to metal surfaces, as with polyolester oils.

Transfer heat 
Both gas and liquid lubricants can transfer heat. However, liquid lubricants are much more effective on account of their high specific heat capacity. Typically the liquid lubricant is constantly circulated to and from a cooler part of the system, although lubricants may be used to warm as well as to cool when a regulated temperature is required. This circulating flow also determines the amount of heat that is carried away in any given unit of time. High flow systems can carry away a lot of heat and have the additional benefit of reducing the thermal stress on the lubricant. Thus lower cost liquid lubricants may be used. The primary drawback is that high flows typically require larger sumps and bigger cooling units. A secondary drawback is that a high flow system that relies on the flow rate to protect the lubricant from thermal stress is susceptible to catastrophic failure during sudden system shut downs. An automotive oil-cooled turbocharger is a typical example. Turbochargers get red hot during operation and the oil that is cooling them only survives as its residence time in the system is very short (i.e. high flow rate). If the system is shut down suddenly (pulling into a service area after a high-speed drive and stopping the engine) the oil that is in the turbo charger immediately oxidizes and will clog the oil ways with deposits. Over time these deposits can completely block the oil ways, reducing the cooling with the result that the turbo charger experiences total failure, typically with seized bearings. Non-flowing lubricants such as greases and pastes are not effective at heat transfer although they do contribute by reducing the generation of heat in the first place.

Carry away contaminants and debris 

Lubricant circulation systems have the benefit of carrying away internally generated debris and external contaminants that get introduced into the system to a filter where they can be removed. Lubricants for machines that regularly generate debris or contaminants such as automotive engines typically contain detergent and dispersant additives to assist in debris and contaminant transport to the filter and removal. Over time the filter will get clogged and require cleaning or replacement, hence the recommendation to change a car's oil filter at the same time as changing the oil. In closed systems such as gear boxes the filter may be supplemented by a magnet to attract any iron fines that get created.

It is apparent that in a circulatory system the oil will only be as clean as the filter can make it, thus it is unfortunate that there are no industry standards by which consumers can readily assess the filtering ability of various automotive filters. Poor automotive filters 
significantly reduce the life of the machine (engine) as well as make the system inefficient.

Transmit power 

Lubricants known as hydraulic fluid are used as the working fluid in hydrostatic power transmission. Hydraulic fluids comprise a large portion of all lubricants produced in the world. The automatic transmission's torque converter is another important application for power transmission with lubricants.

Protect against wear 

Lubricants prevent wear by keeping the moving parts apart. Lubricants may also contain anti-wear or extreme pressure additives to boost their performance against wear and fatigue.

Prevent corrosion 
Many lubricants are formulated with additives that form chemical bonds with surfaces or that exclude moisture, to prevent corrosion and rust. It reduces corrosion between two metallic surface and avoids contact between these surfaces to avoid immersed corrosion.

Seal for gases 
Lubricants will occupy the clearance between moving parts through the capillary force, thus sealing the clearance. This effect can be used to seal pistons and shafts.

Fluid types

 Automotive
 Motor oils
 Petrol (Gasolines) engine oils
 Diesel engine oils
 Automatic transmission fluid
 Gearbox fluids
 Brake fluids
 Hydraulic fluids
 Air conditioning compressor oils
 Tractor (one lubricant for all systems)
 Universal Tractor Transmission Oil – UTTO
 Super Tractor Oil Universal – STOU – includes engine
 Other motors
 2-stroke engine oils
 Industrial
 Hydraulic oils
 Air compressor oils
 Food Grade lubricants
 Gas Compressor oils
 Gear oils
 Bearing and circulating system oils
 Refrigerator compressor oils
 Steam and gas turbine oils
 Aviation
 Gas turbine engine oils
 Piston engine oils
 Marine
 Crosshead cylinder oils
 Crosshead Crankcase oils
 Trunk piston engine oils
 Stern tube lubricants

"Glaze" formation (high-temperature wear) 
A further phenomenon that has undergone investigation in relation to high-temperature wear prevention and lubrication is that of a compacted oxide layer glaze formation. Such glazes are generated by sintering a compacted oxide layer. Such glazes are crystalline, in contrast to the amorphous glazes seen in pottery. The required high temperatures arise from metallic surfaces sliding against each other (or a metallic surface against a ceramic surface). Due to the elimination of metallic contact and adhesion by the generation of oxide, friction and wear is reduced. Effectively, such a surface is self-lubricating.

As the "glaze" is already an oxide, it can survive to very high temperatures in air or oxidising environments. However, it is disadvantaged by it being necessary for the base metal (or ceramic) having to undergo some wear first to generate sufficient oxide debris.

Disposal and environmental impact  

It is estimated that about 50% of all lubricants are released into the environment. Common disposal methods include recycling, burning, landfill and discharge into water, though typically disposal in landfill and discharge into water are strictly regulated in most countries, as even small amount of lubricant can contaminate a large amount of water. Most regulations permit a threshold level of lubricant that may be present in waste streams and companies spend hundreds of millions of dollars annually in treating their waste waters to get to acceptable levels.

Burning the lubricant as fuel, typically to generate electricity, is also governed by regulations mainly on account of the relatively high level of additives present. Burning generates both airborne pollutants and ash rich in toxic materials, mainly heavy metal compounds. Thus lubricant burning takes place in specialized facilities that have incorporated special scrubbers to remove airborne pollutants and have access to landfill sites with permits to handle the toxic ash.

Unfortunately, most lubricant that ends up directly in the environment is due to the general public discharging it onto the ground, into drains, and directly into landfills as trash. Other direct contamination sources include runoff from roadways, accidental spillages, natural or man-made disasters, and pipeline leakages.

Improvement in filtration technologies and processes has now made recycling a viable option (with the rising price of base stock and crude oil). Typically various filtration systems remove particulates, additives, and oxidation products and recover the base oil. The oil may get refined during the process. This base oil is then treated much the same as virgin base oil however there is considerable reluctance to use recycled oils as they are generally considered inferior. Basestock fractionally vacuum distilled from used lubricants has superior properties to all-natural oils, but cost-effectiveness depends on many factors. Used lubricant may also be used as refinery feedstock to become part of crude oil. Again, there is considerable reluctance to this use as the additives, soot, and wear metals will seriously poison/deactivate the critical catalysts in the process. Cost prohibits carrying out both filtration (soot, additives removal) and re-refining (distilling, isomerization, hydrocrack, etc.) however the primary hindrance to recycling still remains the collection of fluids as refineries need continuous supply in amounts measured in cisterns, rail tanks.

Occasionally, unused lubricant requires disposal. The best course of action in such situations is to return it to the manufacturer where it can be processed as a part of fresh batches.

Environment: Lubricants both fresh and used can cause considerable damage to the environment mainly due to their high potential of serious water pollution. Further, the additives typically contained in lubricant can be toxic to flora and fauna. In used fluids, the oxidation products can be toxic as well. Lubricant persistence in the environment largely depends upon the base fluid, however if very toxic additives are used they may negatively affect the persistence. Lanolin lubricants are non-toxic making them the environmental alternative which is safe for both users and the environment.

Societies and industry bodies 

 American Petroleum Institute (API)
 Society of Tribologists and Lubrication Engineers (STLE)
 National Lubricating Grease Institute (NLGI)
 Society of Automotive Engineers (SAE)
 Independent Lubricant Manufacturer Association (ILMA)
 European Automobile Manufacturers Association (ACEA)
 Japanese Automotive Standards Organization (JASO)
 Petroleum Packaging Council (PPC)

Major publications 

 Peer reviewed
 ASME Journal of Tribology
 Tribology International
 Tribology Transactions
 Journal of Synthetic Lubricants
 Tribology Letters
 Lubrication Science
 Trade periodicals
 Tribology and Lubrication Technology
 Fuels & Lubes International
 Oiltrends
 Lubes n' Greases
 Compoundings
 Chemical Market Review
 Machinery lubrication

See also

References

Notes

Sources 

 API 1509, Engine Oil Licensing and Certification System, 15th Edition, 2002. Appendix E, API Base Oil Interchangeability Guidelines for Passenger Car Motor Oils and Diesel Engine Oils (revised)
 Boughton and Horvath, 2003, Environmental Assessment of Used Oil Management Methods, Environmental Science and Technology, V38
 I.A. Inman. Compacted Oxide Layer Formation under Conditions of Limited Debris Retention at the Wear Interface during High Temperature Sliding Wear of Superalloys, Ph.D. Thesis (2003), Northumbria University 
 Mercedes-Benz oil recommendations, extracted from factory manuals and personal research
 Measuring reserve alkalinity and evaluation of wear dependence
 Testing used oil quality, list of possible measurements

External links 

SAE-ISO-AGMA viscosity conversion chart
 Chart of API Gravity and Specific gravity

Petroleum products
 
Tribology